The 1944 UNAM Pumas football team (also known as Pumas Doradoes) represented  the National Autonomous University of Mexico, or UNAM, during the 1944 college football season. The Pumas were coached by Bernard A. Hoban, compiled a 4–1–1, and were invited to the 1945 Sun Bowl, where they were defeated by the Southwestern Pirates. This was the first time an American football team had played in a bowl with a team from Mexico, which did not occur again until the 2011 Kilimanjaro Bowl. Despite the Sun Bowl loss, UNAM claimed their 12th consecutive national championship, a streak dating back to 1933.

Schedule

References

UNAM
UNAM Pumas American football seasons
UNAM Pumas American football